Viktovo is a rural locality (a village) in Kubenskoye Rural Settlement, Vologodsky District, Vologda Oblast, Russia. The population was 27 as of 2002.

Geography 
Viktovo is located 68 km northwest of Vologda (the district's administrative centre) by road. Domanovo is the nearest rural locality.

References 

Rural localities in Vologodsky District